USS Wake Island (CVE-65) was a  of the United States Navy.

She was laid down under a Maritime Commission contract (MC hull 1102) on 6 February 1943 at Vancouver, Washington, by the Kaiser Shipyards; launched on 15 September 1943, sponsored by Mrs. Frederick Carl Sherman, the wife of Rear Admiral Frederick Sherman; and commissioned on 7 November 1943, with Captain Hames R. Tague in command.

Service history

World War II

Atlantic
Following commissioning, Wake Island received supplies, ammunition, and gasoline at Astoria, Oregon, and got underway on 27 November 1943 for Puget Sound and anchored the following day at Bremerton, Washington, where she continued to load supplies and ammunition. The carrier operated in the Puget Sound area conducting structural firing tests and making stops at Port Townsend, Sinclair Inlet, and Seattle before sailing south on 6 December. She arrived at San Francisco, California on 10 December, took on fuel, and, two days later, headed for San Diego, arriving there on 14 December for shakedown and availability. Before departing, the carrier took on board the personnel and planes of Composite Squadron 69 (VC-69).

On 11 January 1944, Wake Island got underway and steamed, via the Panama Canal, to Hampton Roads, Virginia, arriving at Norfolk, Virginia on 26 January.

On 16 February, after loading supplies and embarking Army and Navy officers for transportation, Wake Island set course for Recife, Brazil, the first stop on her voyage to Karachi, India. She arrived at Recife on 1 March and made stops at Cape Town, South Africa, and Diego Suarez Harbor, Madagascar, before arriving at Karachi on 29 March. The carrier began her return trip on 3 April and arrived back at Norfolk on 12 May.

She spent the remainder of May and part of June undergoing alterations and an overhaul. She then took on board the planes and personnel of VC-58 and, on 15 June, set course toward Bermuda for duty as the nucleus of Task Group 22.6 (TG 22.6), a combined, air-and-surface, anti-submarine, hunter-killer group. The pilot, Ensign Frederick L. Moore, braved heavy anti-aircraft fire from U-543, while making two bombing attacks which sank the U-boat. However, no evidence appeared to confirm the kill, so the carrier and her escorts spent the next two weeks hunting the already-destroyed submarine.

An Avenger, armed with depth bombs, was catapulted at 1209. At 1235, a torpedo, apparently fired by a second submarine, hit Fiske midships and broke her in two. The ships of the group managed to maneuver clear of two more torpedoes which were fired at the force. The first report of casualties listed 4 dead, 26 missing, and 55 seriously injured.  was detached to support Howard and later to pick up survivors. As the group was preparing to avenge the loss of Fiske, heavy fog and rain stopped all operations.

On 4 August, TG 22.6 was dissolved, and four days later, Wake Island made rendezvous with Convoy UC-32 as it steamed westward. She left the convoy on the 11th and headed for Hampton Roads. She arrived at Norfolk on the 15th for alterations and repairs which lasted through the 25th. Following post-repair trials and a brief availability, the escort carrier sailed on 29 August for Quonset Point, Rhode Island, to relieve  on carrier aircraft qualification operation duty which lasted until 30 October.

Pacific

Philippines
The carrier entered San Francisco Bay on 28 November, and moored at the Naval Air Station Alameda, California, where she embarked two new aircraft squadrons before heading for Hawaii the following day. She moored at Ford Island, Pearl Harbor on 5 December, detached squadrons VC-9 and VPB-149, and disembarked personnel, planes, and equipment. She arrived at Manus Island on 27 December, discharged all cargo and passengers, sailed for the Palau Islands, and arrived at Kossol Roads on New Year's Day 1945. Late that evening, she loaded ammunition from a barge and got underway at 0642, bound for the Philippines and the forthcoming invasion of Luzon, in company with a tremendous fleet which had gathered for the operation.

Two days later, Wake Island passed through Surigao Strait and launched both SNAP (anti-snooper air patrol) and LCAP (local combat air patrol) aircraft. On 4 January 1945, she was operating in the Sulu Sea and launched a three-hour SNAP. The American planes sighted a single-engine Japanese float plane on the water off the southeastern tip of Panay Island. It appeared to be in the hands of a salvage crew. Two of the scout planes made two strafing runs each and left the plane riddled and the salvage crew dispersed.

Wake Island's surface search radar was jammed by enemy transmission, and the escort carrier went to general quarters at 1714. Fire immediately flared from that carrier's flight and hangar decks, and after 20 minutes, her crew abandoned Ommaney Bay under a dense cloud of black smoke. She burned with explosions of ammunition and was finally scuttled astern of the fleet by a torpedo from an American destroyer.

The ship went to general quarters with bogies on the radar screen, but three threatened raids failed to develop. At 1502, eight LCAP fighters from Wake Island pounced upon a division of Japanese Army fighters. When the melee was over, the Americans claimed three certain kills and a probable without suffering any loss themselves. In all, Wake Island launched three LCAP's during daylight. At 1655, the ship again went to general quarters to repel an air attack and for the next hour was under severe attack. At one time, six single-engine planes were simultaneously diving on carriers off Wake Islands port side. She caught fire and dropped behind, but her efficient damage control efforts enabled her to resume her position in the formation in only 51 minutes, with her flight deck out of commission. During the attack, at least 10 enemy planes splashed within  of Wake Island, and her own anti-aircraft gunners claimed three.

On 13 January, two enemy planes attacked , cruising about  astern of Wake Island. One of the attackers was shot down, but the other scored a hit which briefly slowed that carrier. She soon regained speed and controlled a fire on her hangar deck without losing her position in the formation. Four days later, Wake Island was detached and left Lingayen Gulf in TG 77.14, a force consisting of eight escort carriers and their screen to retire to Ulithi, Caroline Islands. She anchored at Ulithi's southern anchorage from 23 to 31 January, undergoing availability and preparing for further operations. During this period, her home port was changed from Norfolk to Puget Sound, Bremerton, Washington.

Iwo Jima
On 10 February 1945, the carrier got underway to join TG 52.2, which had been established to provide air cover and support while escorting major units to the Volcano Islands and then to furnish naval gunfire, spotting, and direct air support for landing forces. The following day, she steamed to an area off Saipan-Tinian where rehearsals for the invasion took place. On 13 February, Wake Islands commanding officer was designated OTC of Task Unit 52.2.1 (TU 52.2.1).

On 14 February, the carrier set course for Iwo Jima and, two days later, arrived at her operating area  from the southwestern tip of Iwo Jima. Shortly after daylight, the heavy bombardment group began shelling shore installations on the island. Planes from Wake Island flew spotting sorties, attacked defensive works with rocket fire, and flew local antisubmarine patrols and hydrographic observation flights over the beaches. D-day for the invasion of Iwo Jima was 19 February; and on that day, Wake Island operated as before, flying 56 spotting sorties and firing 87 rockets.

, a carrier in her group, was sunk by a kamikaze attack on 21 February. The next day, Wake Island was detached and ordered to proceed to a rendezvous point east of Iwo Jima. There, she refueled on 23 February and set course to return to the operating area east of Iwo Jima. In the ensuing weeks, Wake Island continued her operations supporting the Marines. On 5 March, she received a message of special interest from Commander, TU 52.2.1, Rear Admiral Clifton Sprague: "If your ship is as good as your Air Department and Squadron, it is a standout. I have seen nearly all the combat CVEs' work and I must say the Wake tops them all for efficiency, smoothness and good judgement. I hope we are together again."

The next day, they headed for Ulithi and arrived there on 14 March.

Okinawa
The carrier spent the next five days at anchor, preparing for another operation. She got underway on 21 March to supply air support for forces about to invade Okinawa. Wake Island continued her support of the campaign through the initial landings at Okinawa on 1 April.

On the 3rd, the carrier was operating southeast of Okinawa. At 1722, she completed the landing of her fifth spotting sortie, and all her planes were back on board. Eight minutes later, she went to general quarters, and enemy bogies were reported. At 1742, a violent wave hit the ship while planes were being moved for spotting on the flight deck. Two General Motors FM-2 Wildcats were thrown off the flight deck into the water. Two fighters were flipped over on their backs, and two others received severe damage when tossed about.

At the same instant, two Wildcats broke loose from their lashings on the hangar deck and collided, with major damage to both. At 1744, a Japanese single-engine aircraft plunged at the ship from a high angle and missed the port forward corner of the flight deck, exploding in the water abreast the forecastle. Parts of the aircraft were thrown onto the forecastle and into the gun sponsons. Various compartments were flooded, and the shell plating cracked between the first and second decks. Other shell plating buckled, and the main condensers were flooded with salt water, contaminating some 30,000 US gallons (110 m³) of fresh water and 70,000 US gallons (260 m³) of fuel oil. At 1824, salting made it necessary to secure the forward engine, and the ship proceeded on one propeller. Remarkably, there were no injuries; and, by 2140, corrective measures had been taken, and the ship was again steaming on both engines. While she remained there undergoing inspection by the fleet salvage officer, special precautions were taken to guard against possible Japanese suicide swimmers from islands of the cluster not yet secured.

The carrier set course for Guam on 6 April 1945, and, four days later arrived at Apra Harbor for repairs in drydock which lasted through 20 May.

At Kaika Harbor, Kerama Retto, she loaded bombs, rockets, and dry and fresh provisions, despite many enemy aircraft in the vicinity.

Wake Island continued on support operations until 15 June when Rear Admiral Durgin landed on the carrier for an official visit. In a ceremony held on the flight deck, he presented citations and awards to 16 pilots of VOC-1.

The following day, Wake Island and Dennis were detached, proceeded independently for Kerama Retto, and arrived there on 17 June. She was replenished and then returned to the area southwest of Okinawa to resume flight operations. Two days later, Wake Island received a message detaching her from TG 32.1 due to battle damage received on 3 April and a subsequent finding by the Bureau of Ships that "pending yardwork, this vessel is considered unsafe for operations in a forward area." She headed for Guam and conducted firing practices and launched LASP sorties en route. Upon her arrival at Port Apra on 24 June, all personnel of squadron VOC-1 were transferred to Naval Air Base Agana.

From 25 June-3 July, Wake Island, loaded with nine Grumman F6F Hellcats, 24 Vought F4U Corsairs, 11 Avengers, and two Piper L-4s, made a round-trip to Okinawa and delivered aircraft with 46 ferry pilots to Tactical Air Force, Yontan Field, Okinawa.

On 10 July, she detached Bull and Cape Esperance and proceeded independently to Hawaii. A week later, the ship arrived at Ford Island, Pearl Harbor, where she unloaded her cargo and took on board 138 enlisted men and 49 officers as passengers to the continental United States. On 18 July, Wake Island cleared the channel at Pearl Harbor, bound for southern California. She arrived at San Diego, California on 25 July, and discharged her passengers and planes.

Post-War
While moored at North Island, San Diego, the carrier took on board six Avengers, 10 Wildcats, 53 officers, and 13 men of VC-75 for training and carrier aircraft landing qualifications off San Nicholas Island. She continued to conduct flight qualifications through December 1945.

This period was distinguished on 6 November when the first jet-propelled landing on an aircraft carrier was made on Wake Island. For two days, she conducted tests and landing qualifications for the FR Fireball. Ensign J. C. West took off from the USS Wake Island in a Ryan FR-1 Fireball, a combination prop-jet design, and soon experienced problems with the Wright R-1820-72W Cyclone radial piston engine. Before the reciprocating powerplant failed completely, he started the General Electric I-16 jet engine and returned to the ship, thus making the first ever landing by jet power alone on a carrier.

In 1946, Wake Island prepared for inactivation. She was decommissioned on 5 April; struck from the Naval Vessel Register on the 17th; and subsequently sold for scrap to the Boston Metals Company, Baltimore, Maryland, on 19 April 1946.

Awards
Wake Island earned three battle stars during World War II.

References

External links

 navsource.org: USS Wake Island
 united-states-navy.com: USS Wake Island

Casablanca-class escort carriers
World War II escort aircraft carriers of the United States
Ships built in Vancouver, Washington
Wake Island
1943 ships
S4-S2-BB3 ships